In the 1982–83 season, MC Oran is competing in the National for the 19th time, as well as the Algerian Cup.  It is their 19th consecutive season in the top flight of Algerian football. They will be competing in National 1 and the Algerian Cup.

Competitions

Overview

Championnat National

League table

Results by round

Matches

Algerian Cup

Squad information

Appearances and goals
Only 23 games from 30 in National appearances

|-
! colspan=12 style=background:#dcdcdc; text-align:center| Goalkeepers

|-
! colspan=12 style=background:#dcdcdc; text-align:center| Defenders

|-
! colspan=12 style=background:#dcdcdc; text-align:center| Midfielders

|-
! colspan=12 style=background:#dcdcdc; text-align:center| Forwards

Goalscorers
Includes all competitive matches. The list is sorted alphabetically by surname when total goals are equal.

References

External links
 Algeria 1982/83 season at rsssf.com 
 1982–83 MP Oran season at footballvintage.net 

MC Oran seasons
Algerian football clubs 1982–83 season